The British Columbia School for the Deaf is a provincial school in Burnaby, British Columbia with day programs serving deaf and hard-of-hearing students. The school teaches secondary students. It shares a campus with Burnaby South Secondary School, for hearing students, serving around 50 students.

Elementary school

The British Columbia School for the Deaf is also an active elementary school in Burnaby, British Columbia, serving students from kindergarten to Grade 7.

The elementary school shares a campus with South Slope Elementary School, for hearing students, hosting around 100 students.

Deaf students from Canada often attend Gallaudet University or VCC for post-secondary programs.

References

Schools for the deaf in Canada
Special schools in Canada
Educational institutions established in 1915
Education in Burnaby
1915 establishments in British Columbia